The  is a gigantic octopus-like monster from Ainu folklore, similar to the Nordic Kraken, which supposedly lurks in Uchiura Bay in Hokkaido. Its name can be translated as "tentacle-holding kamuy."

In Shinto
Ainu reverence of this monster has permeated into Shinto, which has incorporated Akkorokamui as a minor kami. Self purification practices for Akkorokamui are often strictly followed. While Akkorokamui is often presented as a benevolent kami with powers to heal and bestow knowledge, it is fickle and has the propensity to do harm. Akkorokamui's nature as an octopus means that it is persistent and it is near impossible to escape its grasp without permission.

Akkorokamui enjoys the sea and offerings which reflect this: fish, crab, mollusks, and the like are particular favorites of Akkorokamui, which give back that which it gave. Homage to Akkorokamui is often for ailments of the limbs or skin, but mental purification and spiritual release is particularly important.

Akkorokamui is characteristically described with the ability to self-amputate, like several octopus species, and regenerate limbs. This characteristic manifests in the belief in Shinto that Akkorokamui has healing powers. Consequently, it is believed among followers that giving offerings to Akkorokamui will heal ailments of the body, in particular, disfigurements and broken limbs.

Shrines in dedication to Akkorokamui and associated octopus deities are found throughout Japan.

In popular culture
 In the Bob's Burgers episode "Flu-ouise", some of Louise Belcher's toys are revealed to be named after Japanese legendary creatures, including an octopus called Akkoro Kamui. They come to life in a fever dream Louise goes through, with Akkoro Kamui sounding like her mother Linda. They also appear in The Bob's Burgers Movie.

See also
 Kraken
 List of cryptids

References

Ainu legendary creatures
Mythological cephalopods
Shinto kami
Mythological monsters
Sea monsters